Mathilukal (Malayalam: മതിലുകൾ, meaning Walls) is a Malayalam novel written by Vaikom Muhammad Basheer in 1965. It is one of the most cherished and well-known love stories in Malayalam. Its hero, Basheer himself, and heroine, Narayani, never meet, yet they love each other passionately. Despite being imprisoned and separated by a huge wall that divides their prisons, the two romance each other.

Theme
The theme of the novel, focusses on the love between Basheer, a prisoner, and a female inmate of the prison, who remains unseen throughout the novel. In Mathilukal, though the broad frame is autobiographical and the narration is first person, the details
seem to contain sprinkles of fantasy.

Plot summary
Basheer, who is jailed for writing against the ruling British, befriends his fellow-inmates and a considerate young jailor. One day, Basheer hears a woman's voice from the other side of the wall – the women's prison. Eventually the two jailbirds become lovebirds. They exchange gifts, and their hearts, without meeting each other. Narayani then comes up with a plan for a meeting: they decide to meet at the hospital a few days later. But before that, Basheer is released, unexpectedly. For once, he does not want the freedom he had craved for. The novel ends with Basheer standing outside the prison with a rose in his hand saying, "outside is an even bigger jail."

Translations
 Voices; The Walls. Translated by V. Abdulla. Bombay: Orient Longman. 1976.
 Walls. Translated by Nivedita Menon. New Delhi: Katha. 1996. pp. 43–72.

Film adaptation

In 1989, a film adaptation of the novel was released, starring Mammootty as Vaikom Muhammad Basheer and K.P.A.C Lalitha as Narayani (voice only), and directed by Adoor Gopalakrishnan. The film was a major critical success, and gained many awards at national and international levels. Mammootty won the National Film Award for Best Actor.

References

External links
Book review by Susan Mathen of Ingoodbooks.com

Novels by Vaikom Muhammad Basheer
Indian autobiographical novels
Indian romance novels
1965 novels
Indian novels adapted into films
Malayalam novels
Novels set in India
Novels set in the 1940s
DC Books books
1965 Indian novels